Santo Domingo is a town and municipality in the Colombian department of Antioquia, part of the subregion of Northeastern Antioquia.

The municipio was founded in 1778 by Don Juan Gregorio Duque. In 1858, the writer Tomás Carrasquilla was born here.

References

Municipalities of Antioquia Department